The 1956 United States presidential election in Kansas took place on November 6, 1956, as part of the 1956 United States presidential election. Voters chose eight representatives, or electors, to the Electoral College, who voted for president and vice president.

Kansas was won by incumbent President Dwight D. Eisenhower (R–Pennsylvania), running with Vice President Richard Nixon, with 65.44% of the popular vote, against Adlai Stevenson (D–Illinois), running with Senator Estes Kefauver, with 34.21% of the popular vote. Eisenhower, as expected, had no trouble carrying his boyhood home state, winning every county in the state except Wyandotte County, having spent his formative years in Abilene.

With 65.44% of the popular vote, Kansas proved to be Eisenhower's fifth strongest state after Vermont, Maine, New Hampshire and Nebraska.

Results

Results by county

See also
 United States presidential elections in Kansas

Notes

References

Kansas
1956
1956 Kansas elections